The National Security Multi-Mission Vessel (NSMV) is a United States Maritime Administration (MARAD) ship designed as training vessels for the US maritime academies.  The vessels will also be equipped to provide emergency humanitarian relief in areas affected by natural disasters such as hurricanes. The first ship was expected to be delivered in 2022. In April 2020, TOTE Services signed a contract with Philly Shipyard (Philadelphia, Pennsylvania) for the construction of up to five NSMVs, with the first two delivered in Spring and Winter 2023 for a cost of US$630M.

Background 
The US maritime academies train future officers and engineers for the US merchant fleet.  An integral part of this training is annual voyage at sea aboard a training vessel. Much of the year the vessels are laid up, and as US government owned ships they can be activated and deployed to provide housing for disaster relief workers. As of 2018 the current vessels were aging. The newest was almost 30 years old and oldest, Empire State, was 56 years old and had an antiquated steam power plant.  The ships also fail international emission standards and this has impacted their training itineraries.  MARAD provides the training ships and in 2015 initiated a program to develop a purpose-built ship design that would combine the training and disaster relief missions. This dual purpose led to the class name of the design as National Security Multi-Mission Vessel.

Design considerations 
In 2015 the Herbert Engineering Corp. of Alameda, CA began work on a preliminary design for what became the NSMV. The ship dimensions would have to fit the existing mooring berths at the service academies.  The design team visited three of the academies to learn of their training requirements. While primarily a training ship, the vessels would also be equipped for disaster relief.  These included a Roll-on/Roll-off side ramp, container space and crane, and a helipad.

Project status 
In February 2018 the design stage was in Phase 3 of development and in sufficient detail to present to shipyards for construction bidding. In March 2018 the US federal budget included funding for the NSMV project and the first ship was expected to enter service in 2022.  A construction contract was to have been awarded to a shipyard in the second quarter of 2019 
but proposed 2019 federal budget reductions cut the allocated amount per ship from $300M to only $205M.  This reduced amount would require abandonment of the NSMV design and a complete redesign for a smaller ship. The 2020 budget requested by President Trump would restore the allocation to $300M. 

In April 2020, TOTE Services signed a contract with Philly Shipyard (Philadelphia, Pennsylvania) for the construction of the first two vessels to be delivered in the Spring and Winter 2023 for a cost of US$630M. Steel cutting for NSMV1 began in December 2020, for NSMV2 in March 2021, and for NSMV3 in July 2022.  In January 2020 a contract was signed with the same shipyard for NSMV4 with an anticipated delivery in 2024. Funding for NSMV5 was approved in March 2022.

The keel for the NSMV 1 was laid on 10 December 2021. The first ship was floated out for fitting and the grand block for NSMV 2 laid in September 2022. Steel cutting for NSMV 3 began in July 2022.

The vessels are anticipated to be delivered to the following maritime academies:
 NSMV 1  - SUNY Maritime College,  2023
 NSMV 2 - Massachusetts Maritime Academy, 2024 
 NSMV 3 - Maine Maritime Academy, late 2024
 NSMV 4  - Texas A&M University at Galveston, 2025 
 NSMV 5 - California State University Maritime Academy, 2026

References

External links 
 Publicity video for the National Security Multi-Mission Vessel

United States
Proposed ships